Corrado Augias (born 26 January 1935) is an Italian journalist, writer and TV host. He was also a member of the European Parliament in 1994–1999 for the Democratic Party of the Left.

Biography 
Born in Rome, Augias became popular in Italy as host of several shows dealing with mysteries and cases of the past, such as Telefono giallo and Enigma. His current show is Quante storie, aired by Rai 3.

As writer, Augias issued a series of crime novels set in the early 20th century and others. His other works include several essays about peculiar features of the world's most important cities: I segreti di ("The Secrets of...") Rome, Paris, New York City and London. In 2006, in collaboration with scholar Mauro Pesce, he published a work dealing with the gospel's description of the life of Jesus (Inchiesta su Gesù), which became a bestseller in Italy. The book elicited many reactions, for example Pietro Ciavarella and Valerio Bernardi wrote Risposta a Inchiesta su Gesù, aiming to provide 'informed and constructive apologetics'.

As a journalist, Augias worked for La Repubblica, L'Espresso and Panorama. He has also been a playwright. He is atheist.

In December 2020 he  renounced his Knight Grand Cross of the French Legion of Honour, after the decoration was awarded to Egyptian president Al-Sissi.

Honour 
 : Knight Grand Cross of the Order of Merit of the Italian Republic (4 may 2006)

See also 
 75225 Corradoaugias, asteroid

References

External links

Official webpage on Arnoldo Mondadori

1935 births
Living people
Writers from Rome
Italian journalists
Italian male journalists
Italian male writers
Italian television personalities
Democratic Party of the Left MEPs
MEPs for Italy 1994–1999
La Repubblica people
Légion d'honneur refusals
Knights Grand Cross of the Order of Merit of the Italian Republic